Power of the People (SL) is a Ukrainian liberal political party registered by the Ministry of Justice on 20 August 2014. On 8 February 2019, Dmytro Gnap was nominated as the party's candidate for the 2019 Ukrainian presidential election. On 1 March, Gnap withdrew  his candidacy in favour of supporting fellow candidate Anatoliy Hrytsenko. The following day the party officially withdraw Gnap's candidacy.

References

2014 establishments in Ukraine
Alliance of Liberals and Democrats for Europe Party member parties
Liberal parties in Ukraine
Political parties established in 2014
Political parties in Ukraine
Pro-European political parties in Ukraine